École polytechnique universitaire de Sorbonne Université (Polytech Sorbonne) a French engineering College in Paris, France, created in 1983.

The school trains engineers in high sectors : Agribusiness, Electronics and Computers, Applied Mathematics and Computers, Materials, Robotics, Earth sciences, Mechanical engineering.

Located in the city of Paris, Polytech Sorbonne is a public higher education institution. The school is a member of the Sorbonne University.

References

External links
 Polytech Sorbonne

1983 establishments in France
Educational institutions established in 1983
Engineering universities and colleges in France
Polytech Sorbonne
Universities and colleges in Paris
Sorbonne University